Nans Peters (born 12 March 1994) is a French cyclist, who currently rides for UCI WorldTeam .

Career

Amateur career
Before turning professional, he set a new record for most selections for the French national Under-23 team, being chosen 20 times: he established himself as the team's road captain, and supported David Gaudu in his victory at the Tour de l'Avenir in 2016.

Professional career
After turning professional with AG2R La Mondiale in 2017, he was originally slated to make his Grand Tour debut at the 2018 Giro d'Italia, but was unable to compete after breaking his collarbone during the Classic Loire Atlantique during March of that year. In August 2018, he was named in the startlist for the Vuelta a España. In May 2019, he was named in the startlist for the Giro d'Italia, and went on to win stage 17 of the race. In August 2020, he was named in the start list for the Tour de France, and went on to win stage 8 of the race.

Personal life
He was named after , a French television serial of the 1970s of which his mother was a fan.

Major results

2012
 1st  Overall Tour du Valromey
 7th Overall Ronde des Vallées
1st  Mountains classification
1st Stage 3
2014
 3rd Time trial, National Under-23 Road Championships
 4th Piccolo Giro di Lombardia
2015
 3rd Time trial, National Under-23 Road Championships
 4th Overall Tour de l'Ain
 4th Ronde van Vlaanderen Beloften
2016
 10th Overall ZLM Roompot Tour
2018
 5th Overall Tour de l'Ain
2019
 Giro d'Italia
1st Stage 17
Held  after Stages 9–11
 3rd Gran Piemonte
 3rd Paris–Chauny
 3rd Tokyo 2020 Test Event
 5th Trofeo Laigueglia
 9th Overall Route d'Occitanie
 9th Grand Prix Cycliste de Montréal
2020
 Tour de France
1st Stage 8
 Combativity award Stage 8
 9th Faun-Ardèche Classic
2022
 8th Tour du Jura
2023
 1st Trofeo Laigueglia

Grand Tour general classification results timeline

References

External links

1994 births
Living people
French male cyclists
Sportspeople from Grenoble
French Tour de France stage winners
French Giro d'Italia stage winners
Cyclists from Auvergne-Rhône-Alpes